Otto Lessing was a major general in the United States Marine Corps.

Biography
Lessing was born on May 18, 1904, in Munich, Germany. Later, he graduated from the University of Wisconsin-Madison. His home of record was Urbana, Illinois.

Career
Lessing joined the Marine Corps in 1924. During World War II, he was awarded the Bronze Star Medal with Combat Valor device for his actions as a battalion commander during the Battle of Saipan. He retired in 1964.

References

People from Urbana, Illinois
United States Marine Corps generals
United States Marine Corps personnel of World War II
University of Wisconsin–Madison alumni
1904 births
Year of death missing
Military personnel from Munich
German emigrants to the United States